Les Bordes-sur-Arize (literally Les Bordes on Arize) is a commune in the Ariège department of southwestern France.

Population
Inhabitants of Les Bordes-sur-Arize are called Bordésiens.

See also
Communes of the Ariège department

References

Communes of Ariège (department)
Ariège communes articles needing translation from French Wikipedia